In demonology, Ziminiar or Zymymar is one of the four principal kings that have power over the seventy-two demons that are supposedly constrained by King Solomon, according to the Lesser Key of Solomon. Ziminiar is not to be conjured except on great occasions. The other three demon-kings are Amaymon, Corson, and Gaap (although some translations of The Lesser Key of Solomon consider the four kings to be Belial, Beleth, Asmodai, and Gaap, not specifying the cardinal direction that they rule over).

He is the king of the north according to both The Lesser Key of Solomon and Pseudomonarchia Daemonum.

See also
 Amaymon is also one of the four cardinal spirits, of the east in the Lesser Key of Solomon.
 Corson is also one of the four cardinal spirits, of the west in the Lesser Key of Solomon.
 Gaap is also one of the four cardinal spirits, of the south in the Lesser Key of Solomon.

References 

Goetic demons